The Andy Warhol Museum of Modern Art in Medzilaborce, Slovakia, was established in 1991 by the American family of the artist Andy Warhol and the Slovak Ministry of Culture. Until 1996, AWMMA (the English-language acronym of the museum) was called The Warhol Family Museum of Modern Art.

Two exhibitions in 1962 announced Andy Warhol's dramatic entry into the art world. In July, at the Ferus Gallery in Los Angeles, he exhibited his now-iconic Campbell's Soup Cans. The work's 32 canvases, each one featuring a different variety of the company's 32 soups, were lined up in a single row on a ledge that wrapped around the gallery. 'Cans sit on shelves,' the gallery director, Irving Blum, later said of the installation. 'Why not?' The paintings marked a breakthrough for Warhol, who had previously worked as a commercial illustrator: they were among his first works based on consumer goods, and among the first to embrace serial repetition. Although he hand-painted each canvas, they were made to seem mechanically produced

The museum's Andy Warhol Permanent Exhibition consists of 160 Warhol works of art, mostly drawings and silkscreens, as well as Warhol memorabilia. Also displayed are works by Andy Warhol's brother, Paul Warhol, and Paul Warhol's son, James Warhola. The museum features prominently in the 2001 documentary Absolut Warhola, directed by Stanislaw Mucha.

See also
 The Andy Warhol Museum, located in Warhol's native Pittsburgh, US.
 List of single-artist museums

References

External links

 

1991 establishments in Slovakia
Art museums established in 1991
Art museums and galleries in Slovakia
Tourist attractions in Prešov Region
Medzilaborce
Warhol Museum of Modern Art
Museum of Modern Art